Central America (  or  ) is a subregion of the Americas. Its boundaries are defined as bordering Mexico to the north, Colombia to the south, the Caribbean Sea to the east, and the Pacific Ocean to the west. Central America usually consists of seven countries: Belize, Costa Rica, El Salvador, Guatemala, Honduras, Nicaragua, and Panama. Within Central America is the Mesoamerican biodiversity hotspot, which extends from northern Guatemala to central Panama. Due to the presence of several active geologic faults and the Central America Volcanic Arc, there is a high amount of seismic activity in the region, such as volcanic eruptions and earthquakes which has resulted in death, injury, and property damage.

In the pre-Columbian era, Central America was inhabited by the Indigenous peoples of Mesoamerica to the north and west and the Isthmo-Colombian peoples to the south and east. Following the Spanish expedition of Christopher Columbus' voyages to the Americas, Spain began to colonize the Americas. From 1609 to 1821, the majority of Central American territories (except for what would become Belize and Panama, and including the modern Mexican state of Chiapas) were governed by the viceroyalty of New Spain from Mexico City as the Captaincy General of Guatemala. On 24 August 1821, Spanish Viceroy Juan de O'Donojú signed the Treaty of Córdoba, which established New Spain's independence from Spain. On 15 September 1821, the Act of Independence of Central America was enacted to announce Central America's separation from the Spanish Empire and provide for the establishment of a new Central American state. Some of New Spain's provinces in the Central American region (i.e. what would become Guatemala, Honduras, El Salvador, Nicaragua and Costa Rica) were annexed to the First Mexican Empire; however in 1823 they seceded from Mexico to form the Federal Republic of Central America until 1838.

In 1838, Costa Rica, Guatemala, Honduras, and Nicaragua became the first of Central America's seven states to become independent countries, followed by El Salvador in 1841, Panama in 1903, and Belize in 1981. Despite the dissolution of the Federal Republic of Central America, countries like Costa Rica, El Salvador, Guatemala, Honduras, and Nicaragua continue to maintain a Central American identity. The Belizeans are usually identified as culturally Caribbean rather than Central American, while the Panamanians identify themselves more broadly with their South American neighbours.

The Spanish-speaking countries officially include both North America and South America as a single continent, which is split into four subregions: North America (Northern America and Mexico), Central America, South America, and Insular America (the West Indies).

Different definitions 

"Central America" may mean different things to various people, based upon different contexts:

 The non-official United Nations geoscheme for the Americas defines Central America as all states of mainland North America south of the United States, hence grouping Mexico as part of Central America for statistics purposes, but historically Mexico is considered North America.
 Middle America is usually thought to comprise Mexico to the north of the 7 states of Central America as well as Colombia and Venezuela to the south. Usually, the whole of the Caribbean to the northeast, and sometimes the Guyanas, are also included. According to one source, the term "Central America" was used as a synonym for "Middle America" at least as recently as 1962.
 In Ibero-America (Spanish and Portuguese speaking American countries), the Americas is considered a single continent (America), and Central America is considered a subregion of the continent comprising the seven countries south of Mexico and north of Colombia. 
 For the people living in the five countries, formerly part of the Federal Republic of Central America there is a distinction between the Spanish language terms "América Central" and "Centroamérica". While both can be translated into English as "Central America", "América Central" is generally used to refer to the geographical area of the seven countries between Mexico and Colombia, while "Centroamérica" is used when referring to the former members of the Federation emphasizing the shared culture and history of the region. 
 In Portuguese as a rule and occasionally in Spanish and other languages, the entirety of the Antilles is often included in the definition of Central America. Indeed, the Dominican Republic is a full member of the Central American Integration System.

History 

Central America was formed more than 3 million years ago, as part of the Isthmus of Panama, when its portion of land connected each side of water.

In the Pre-Columbian era, the northern areas of Central America were inhabited by the indigenous peoples of Mesoamerica. Most notable among these were the Mayans, who had built numerous cities throughout the region, and the Aztecs, who had created a vast empire. The pre-Columbian cultures of eastern El Salvador, eastern Honduras, Caribbean Nicaragua, most of Costa Rica and Panama were predominantly speakers of the Chibchan languages at the time of European contact and are considered by some culturally different and grouped in the Isthmo-Colombian Area.

Following the Spanish expedition of Christopher Columbus's voyages to the Americas, the Spanish sent many expeditions to the region, and they began their conquest of Maya territory in 1523. Soon after the conquest of the Aztec Empire, Spanish conquistador Pedro de Alvarado commenced the conquest of northern Central America for the Spanish Empire. Beginning with his arrival in Soconusco in 1523, Alvarado's forces systematically conquered and subjugated most of the major Maya kingdoms, including the K'iche', Tz'utujil, Pipil, and the Kaqchikel. By 1528, the conquest of Guatemala was nearly complete, with only the Petén Basin remaining outside the Spanish sphere of influence. The last independent Maya kingdoms – the Kowoj and the Itza people – were finally defeated in 1697, as part of the Spanish conquest of Petén.

In 1538, Spain established the Real Audiencia of Panama, which had jurisdiction over all land from the Strait of Magellan to the Gulf of Fonseca. This entity was dissolved in 1543, and most of the territory within Central America then fell under the jurisdiction of the Audiencia Real de Guatemala. This area included the current territories of Costa Rica, El Salvador, Guatemala, Honduras, Nicaragua, and the Mexican state of Chiapas, but excluded the lands that would become Belize and Panama. The president of the Audiencia, which had its seat in Antigua Guatemala, was the governor of the entire area. In 1609 the area became a captaincy general and the governor was also granted the title of captain general. The Captaincy General of Guatemala encompassed most of Central America, with the exception of present-day Belize and Panama.

The Captaincy General of Guatemala lasted for more than two centuries, but began to fray after a rebellion in 1811 which began in the Intendancy of San Salvador. The Captaincy General formally ended on 15 September 1821, with the signing of the Act of Independence of Central America. Mexican independence was achieved at virtually the same time with the signing of the Treaty of Córdoba and the Declaration of Independence of the Mexican Empire, and the entire region was finally independent from Spanish authority by 28 September 1821.

Historic flags of Central American Unions

Historic Coat of Arms of Central American Unions

From its independence from Spain in 1821 until 1823, the former Captaincy General remained intact as part of the short-lived First Mexican Empire. When the Emperor of Mexico abdicated on 19 March 1823, Central America again became independent. On 1 July 1823, the Congress of Central America peacefully seceded from Mexico and declared absolute independence from all foreign nations, and the region formed the Federal Republic of Central America.

The Federal Republic of Central America was a representative democracy with its capital at Guatemala City. This union consisted of the provinces of Costa Rica, El Salvador, Guatemala, Honduras, Los Altos, Mosquito Coast, and Nicaragua. The lowlands of southwest Chiapas, including Soconusco, initially belonged to the Republic until 1824, when Mexico annexed most of Chiapas and began its claims to Soconusco. The Republic lasted from 1823 to 1838, when it disintegrated as a result of civil wars.

The territory that now makes up Belize was heavily contested in a dispute that continued for decades after Guatemala achieved independence. Spain, and later Guatemala, considered this land a Guatemalan department. In 1862, Britain formally declared it a British colony and named it British Honduras. It became independent as Belize in 1981.

Panama, situated in the southernmost part of Central America on the Isthmus of Panama, has for most of its history been culturally and politically linked to South America. Panama was part of the Province of Tierra Firme from 1510 until 1538 when it came under the jurisdiction of the newly formed Audiencia Real de Panama. Beginning in 1543, Panama was administered as part of the Viceroyalty of Peru, along with all other Spanish possessions in South America. Panama remained as part of the Viceroyalty of Peru until 1739, when it was transferred to the Viceroyalty of New Granada, the capital of which was located at Santa Fé de Bogotá. Panama remained as part of the Viceroyalty of New Granada until the disestablishment of that viceroyalty in 1819. A series of military and political struggles took place from that time until 1822, the result of which produced the republic of Gran Colombia. After the dissolution of Gran Colombia in 1830, Panama became part of a successor state, the Republic of New Granada. From 1855 until 1886, Panama existed as Panama State, first within the Republic of New Granada, then within the Granadine Confederation, and finally within the United States of Colombia. The United States of Colombia was replaced by the Republic of Colombia in 1886. As part of the Republic of Colombia, Panama State was abolished and it became the Isthmus Department. Despite the many political reorganizations, Colombia was still deeply plagued by conflict, which eventually led to the secession of Panama on 3 November 1903. Only after that time did some begin to regard Panama as a North or Central American entity.

By the 1930s the United Fruit Company owned  of land in Central America and the Caribbean and was the single largest land owner in Guatemala. Such holdings gave it great power over the governments of small countries. That was one of the factors that led to the coining of the phrase banana republic.

After more than two hundred years of social unrest, violent conflict, and revolution, Central America today remains in a period of political transformation. Poverty, social injustice, and violence are still widespread. Nicaragua is the second poorest country in the western hemisphere (only Haiti is poorer).

Flags of modern Central America

Coat of Arms of modern Central America

Geography 

Central America is a part of North America consisting of a tapering isthmus running from the southern extent of Mexico to the northwestern portion of South America. Central America has the Gulf of Mexico, a body of water within the Atlantic Ocean, to the north; the Caribbean Sea, also part of the Atlantic Ocean, to the northeast; and the Pacific Ocean to the southwest. Some physiographists define the Isthmus of Tehuantepec as the northern geographic border of Central America, while others use the northwestern borders of Belize and Guatemala. From there, the Central American land mass extends southeastward to the Atrato River, where it connects to the Pacific Lowlands in northwestern South America.

Of the many mountain ranges within Central America, the longest are the Sierra Madre de Chiapas, the Cordillera Isabelia and the Cordillera de Talamanca. At , Volcán Tajumulco is the highest peak in Central America. Other high points of Central America are as listed in the table below:

Between the mountain ranges lie fertile valleys that are suitable for the raising of livestock and for the production of coffee, tobacco, beans and other crops. Most of the population of Honduras, Costa Rica and Guatemala lives in valleys.

Trade winds have a significant effect upon the climate of Central America. Temperatures in Central America are highest just prior to the summer wet season, and are lowest during the winter dry season, when trade winds contribute to a cooler climate. The highest temperatures occur in April, due to higher levels of sunlight, lower cloud cover and a decrease in trade winds.

Biodiversity

Central American forests

Central America is part of the Mesoamerican biodiversity hotspot, boasting 7% of the world's biodiversity. The Pacific Flyway is a major north–south flyway for migratory birds in the Americas, extending from Alaska to Tierra del Fuego. Due to the funnel-like shape of its land mass, migratory birds can be seen in very high concentrations in Central America, especially in the spring and autumn. As a bridge between North America and South America, Central America has many species from the Nearctic and the Neotropical realms. However the southern countries (Costa Rica and Panama) of the region have more biodiversity than the northern countries (Guatemala and Belize), meanwhile the central countries (Honduras, Nicaragua and El Salvador) have the least biodiversity. The table below shows recent statistics:

Over 300 species of the region's flora and fauna are threatened, 107 of which are classified as critically endangered. The underlying problems are deforestation, which is estimated by FAO at 1.2% per year in Central America and Mexico combined, fragmentation of rainforests and the fact that 80% of the vegetation in Central America has already been converted to agriculture.

Efforts to protect fauna and flora in the region are made by creating ecoregions and nature reserves. 36% of Belize's land territory falls under some form of official protected status, giving Belize one of the most extensive systems of terrestrial protected areas in the Americas. In addition, 13% of Belize's marine territory are also protected. A large coral reef extends from Mexico to Honduras: the Mesoamerican Barrier Reef System. The Belize Barrier Reef is part of this. The Belize Barrier Reef is home to a large diversity of plants and animals, and is one of the most diverse ecosystems of the world. It is home to 70 hard coral species, 36 soft coral species, 500 species of fish and hundreds of invertebrate species.
So far only about 10% of the species in the Belize barrier reef have been discovered.

Flora

National flowers of Central America

National trees of Central America

From 2001 to 2010,  of forest were lost in the region. In 2010 Belize had 63% of remaining forest cover, Costa Rica 46%, Panama 45%, Honduras 41%, Guatemala 37%, Nicaragua 29%, and El Salvador 21%. Mangroves and deserts contributed only 1% to the loss in forest vegetation.

Montane forests
The Central American pine-oak forests ecoregion, in the tropical and subtropical coniferous forests biome, is found in Central America and southern Mexico. The pine-oak forests lie between  elevation, and are surrounded at lower elevations by tropical moist forests and tropical dry forests. Higher elevations above  are usually covered with Central American montane forests. The Central American pine-oak forests are composed of many species characteristic of temperate North America including oak, pine, fir, and cypress.

Tree species include evergreen oaks, members of the laurel family, species of Weinmannia and Magnolia, and Drimys granadensis. The cloud forest of Sierra de las Minas, Guatemala, is the largest in Central America. In some areas of southeastern Honduras there are cloud forests, the largest located near the border with Nicaragua. In Nicaragua, cloud forests are situated near the border with Honduras, but many were cleared to grow coffee. There are still some temperate evergreen hills in the north. The only cloud forest in the Pacific coastal zone of Central America is on the Mombacho volcano in Nicaragua. In Costa Rica, there are laurel forests in the Cordillera de Tilarán and Volcán Arenal, called Monteverde, also in the Cordillera de Talamanca.

The Central American montane forests are an ecoregion of the tropical and subtropical moist broadleaf forests biome, as defined by the World Wildlife Fund. These forests are of the moist deciduous and the semi-evergreen seasonal subtype of tropical and subtropical moist broadleaf forests and receive high overall rainfall with a warm summer wet season and a cooler winter dry season.

Fauna

Legendary National Birds of Central America

Ecoregions are not only established to protect the forests themselves but also because they are habitats for an incomparably rich and often endemic fauna. Almost half of the bird population of the Talamancan montane forests in Costa Rica and Panama are endemic to this region. Several birds are listed as threatened, most notably the resplendent quetzal (Pharomacrus mocinno), three-wattled bellbird (Procnias tricarunculata), bare-necked umbrellabird (Cephalopterus glabricollis), and black guan (Chamaepetes unicolor). Many of the amphibians are endemic and depend on the existence of forest. The golden toad that once inhabited a small region in the Monteverde Reserve, which is part of the Talamancan montane forests, has not been seen alive since 1989 and is listed as extinct by IUCN. The exact causes for its extinction are unknown. Global warming may have played a role, because the development of that frog is typical for this area may have been compromised. Seven small mammals are endemic to the Costa Rica-Chiriqui highlands within the Talamancan montane forest region. Jaguars, cougars, spider monkeys, as well as tapirs, and anteaters live in the woods of Central America. The Central American red brocket is a brocket deer found in Central America's tropical forest.

Geology 

Central America is geologically very active, with volcanic eruptions and earthquakes occurring frequently, and tsunamis occurring occasionally. Many thousands of people have died as a result of these natural disasters.

Most of Central America rests atop the Caribbean Plate. This tectonic plate converges with the Cocos, Nazca, and North American plates to form the Middle America Trench, a major subduction zone. Many large earthquakes have occurred as a result of seismic activity at the Middle America Trench. For example, subduction of the Cocos Plate beneath the North American Plate at the Middle America Trench is believed to have caused the 1985 Mexico City earthquake that killed as many as 40,000 people. Seismic activity at the Middle America Trench is also responsible for earthquakes in 1902, 1942, 1956, 1982, 1992, January 2001, February 2001, 2007, 2012, 2014, and many other earthquakes throughout Central America.

The Middle America Trench is not the only source of seismic activity in Central America. The Motagua Fault is an onshore continuation of the Cayman Trough which forms part of the tectonic boundary between the North American Plate and the Caribbean Plate. This transform fault cuts right across Guatemala and then continues offshore until it merges with the Middle America Trench along the Pacific coast of Mexico, near Acapulco. Seismic activity at the Motagua Fault has been responsible for earthquakes in 1717, 1773, 1902, 1976, 1980, and 2009.

Though less active than the Motagua Fault, seismic activity at the Chixoy-Polochic Fault is still thought to be capable of producing very large earthquakes, such as the 1816 earthquake of Guatemala.

Managua, the capital of Nicaragua, was devastated by earthquakes in 1931 and 1972.

Volcanic eruptions are also common in Central America. In 1968 the Arenal Volcano, in Costa Rica, erupted killing 87 people as the 3 villages of Tabacon, Pueblo Nuevo and San Luis were buried under pyroclastic flows and debris. Fertile soils from weathered volcanic lava have made it possible to sustain dense populations in the agriculturally productive highland areas.

Demographics

Capital cities of Central America

Human Development Index values are from the estimates for 2017.

Languages 

The official language majority in all Central American countries is Spanish, except in Belize, where the official language is English. Mayan languages constitute a language family consisting of about 26 related languages. Guatemala formally recognized 21 of these in 1996. Xinca, Miskito, and Garifuna are also present in Central America.

Ethnic groups 

This region of the continent is very rich in terms of ethnic groups. The majority of the population is mestizo, with sizable Mayan and African descendent populations present, including Xinca and Garifuna minorities. The immigration of Arabs, Jews, Chinese, Europeans and others brought additional groups to the area.

Religious groups

Cathedrals of Central America

The predominant religion in Central America is Christianity (95.6%). Beginning with the Spanish colonization of Central America in the 16th century, Roman Catholicism became the most popular religion in the region until the first half of the 20th century. Since the 1960s, there has been an increase in other Christian groups, particularly Protestantism, as well as other religious organizations, and individuals identifying themselves as having no religion.

Source: Jason Mandrik, Operation World Statistics (2020).

Protestantism in Central America also include Independent Christian, most of total Protestants in this region (+80%) are Evangelicals, the rest follow traditional beliefs.
Other Christian include Other Traditional Churches (Orthodox, Episcopalian, etc.) and contemporary churches (Mormons, Adventists, Scientology, etc.), also include Non-denominational Christian who are the most numerous group, specially in Guatemala.

Culture

Central American art

National dishes of Central America

 Central American music
 Central American cuisine
 List of cuisines of the Americas – Central American cuisine

Sport 

 Central American Games
 Central American and Caribbean Games
 1926 Central American and Caribbean Games – the first time this event occurred
 Central American Football Union
 Surfing

Politics

Leaders of Central America

Integration 

Central America is currently undergoing a process of political, economic and cultural transformation that started in 1907 with the creation of the Central American Court of Justice.

In 1951 the integration process continued with the signature of the San Salvador Treaty, which created the ODECA, the Organization of Central American States. However, the unity of the ODECA was limited by conflicts between several member states.

In 1991, the integration agenda was further advanced by the creation of the Central American Integration System (Sistema para la Integración Centroamericana, or SICA). SICA provides a clear legal basis to avoid disputes between the member states. SICA membership includes the 7 nations of Central America plus the Dominican Republic, a state that is traditionally considered part of the Caribbean.

On 6 December 2008, SICA announced an agreement to pursue a common currency and common passport for the member nations. No timeline for implementation was discussed.

Central America already has several supranational institutions such as the Central American Parliament, the Central American Bank for Economic Integration and the Central American Common Market.

On 22 July 2011, President Mauricio Funes of El Salvador became the first president pro tempore to SICA. El Salvador also became the headquarters of SICA with the inauguration of a new building.

Foreign relations 

Until recently, all Central American countries maintained diplomatic relations with Taiwan instead of China. President Óscar Arias of Costa Rica, however, established diplomatic relations with China in 2007, severing formal diplomatic ties with Taiwan. After breaking off relations with the Republic of China in 2017, Panama established diplomatic relations with the People's Republic of China. In August 2018, El Salvador also severed ties with Taiwan to formally start recognizing the People's Republic of China as sole China, a move many considered lacked transparency due to its abruptness and reports of the Chinese government's desires to invest in the department of La Union while also promising to fund the ruling party's reelection campaign. The President of El Salvador, Nayib Bukele, broke diplomatic relations with Taiwan and established ties with China. On 9 December 2021, Nicaragua resumed relations with the PRC.

Parliament 

The Central American Parliament (aka PARLACEN) is a political and parliamentary body of SICA. The parliament started around 1980, and its primary goal was to resolve conflicts in Nicaragua, Guatemala, and El Salvador. Although the group was disbanded in 1986, ideas of unity of Central Americans still remained, so a treaty was signed in 1987 to create the Central American Parliament and other political bodies. Its original members were Guatemala, El Salvador, Nicaragua and Honduras. The parliament is the political organ of Central America, and is part of SICA. New members have since then joined including Panama and the Dominican Republic.

Costa Rica is not a member State of the Central American Parliament and its adhesion remains as a very unpopular topic at all levels of the Costa Rican society due to existing strong political criticism towards the regional parliament, since it is regarded by Costa Ricans as a menace to democratic accountability and effectiveness of integration efforts. Excessively high salaries for its members, legal immunity of jurisdiction from any member State, corruption, lack of a binding nature and effectiveness of the regional parliament's decisions, high operative costs and immediate membership of Central American Presidents once they leave their office and presidential terms, are the most common reasons invoked by Costa Ricans against the Central American Parliament.

Economy 

 

Signed in 2004, the Central American Free Trade Agreement (CAFTA) is an agreement between the United States, Costa Rica, El Salvador, Guatemala, Honduras, Nicaragua, and the Dominican Republic. The treaty is aimed at promoting free trade among its members.

Guatemala has the largest economy in the region. Its main exports are coffee, sugar, bananas, petroleum, clothing, and cardamom. Of its 10.29 billion dollar annual exports, 40.2% go to the United States, 11.1% to neighboring El Salvador, 8% to Honduras, 5.5% to Mexico, 4.7% to Nicaragua, and 4.3% to Costa Rica.

The region is particularly attractive for companies (especially clothing companies) because of its geographical proximity to the United States, very low wages and considerable tax advantages. In addition, the decline in the prices of coffee and other export products and the structural adjustment measures promoted by the international financial institutions have partly ruined agriculture, favouring the emergence of maquiladoras. This sector accounts for 42 per cent of total exports from El Salvador, 55 per cent from Guatemala, and 65 per cent from Honduras. However, its contribution to the economies of these countries is disputed; raw materials are imported, jobs are precarious and low-paid, and tax exemptions weaken public finances.

They are also criticised for the working conditions of employees: insults and physical violence, abusive dismissals (especially of pregnant workers), working hours, non-payment of overtime. According to Lucrecia Bautista, coordinator of the maquilas sector of the audit firm Coverco, labour law regulations are regularly violated in maquilas and there is no political will to enforce their application. In the case of infringements, the labour inspectorate shows remarkable leniency. It is a question of not discouraging investors. Trade unionists are subject to pressure, and sometimes to kidnapping or murder. In some cases, business leaders have used the services of the maras. Finally, black lists containing the names of trade unionists or political activists are circulating in employers' circles.

Economic growth in Central America is projected to slow slightly in 2014–15, as country-specific domestic factors offset the positive effects from stronger economic activity in the United States.

Tourism

Central American coast

Tourism in Belize has grown considerably in more recent times, and it is now the second largest industry in the nation. Belizean Prime Minister Dean Barrow has stated his intention to use tourism to combat poverty throughout the country. The growth in tourism has positively affected the agricultural, commercial, and finance industries, as well as the construction industry. The results for Belize's tourism-driven economy have been significant, with the nation welcoming almost one million tourists in a calendar year for the first time in its history in 2012. Belize is also the only country in Central America with English as its official language, making this country a comfortable destination for English-speaking tourists.

Costa Rica is the most visited nation in Central America. Tourism in Costa Rica is one of the fastest growing economic sectors of the country, having become the largest source of foreign revenue by 1995. Since 1999, tourism has earned more foreign exchange than bananas, pineapples and coffee exports combined. The tourism boom began in 1987, with the number of visitors up from 329,000 in 1988, through 1.03 million in 1999, to a historical record of 2.43 million foreign visitors and $1.92-billion in revenue in 2013. In 2012 tourism contributed with 12.5% of the country's GDP and it was responsible for 11.7% of direct and indirect employment.

Tourism in Nicaragua has grown considerably recently, and it is now the second largest industry in the nation. Nicaraguan President Daniel Ortega has stated his intention to use tourism to combat poverty throughout the country. The growth in tourism has positively affected the agricultural, commercial, and finance industries, as well as the construction industry. The results for Nicaragua's tourism-driven economy have been significant, with the nation welcoming one million tourists in a calendar year for the first time in its history in 2010.

Transport

Roads 

The Inter-American Highway is the Central American section of the Pan-American Highway, and spans  between Nuevo Laredo, Mexico, and Panama City, Panama. Because of the  break in the highway known as the Darién Gap, it is not possible to cross between Central America and South America in an automobile.

Waterways

Ports and harbors

Airports

Railways

Education 

 List of architecture schools in Central America
 List of universities in Belize
 List of universities in Costa Rica
 List of universities in El Salvador
 List of universities in Guatemala
 List of universities in Honduras
 List of universities in Nicaragua
 List of universities in Panama

See also 

 Americas (terminology)
 Central American Seaway
 Index of Central America-related articles
 Index of Belize-related articles
 Index of Costa Rica-related articles
 Index of El Salvador–related articles
 Index of Guatemala-related articles
 Index of Honduras-related articles
 Index of Nicaragua-related articles
 Index of Panama-related articles
 List of largest cities in Central America
 Cantons of Costa Rica
 List of cities in Belize
 List of cities in El Salvador
 List of cities in Honduras
 List of cities in Nicaragua
 List of cities in Panama
 List of places in Guatemala
 West Indies

Notes

References

Further reading 
 Berger, Mark T. Under northern eyes: Latin American studies and US hegemony in the Americas, 1898–1990. (Indiana UP, 1995).
 Biekart, Kees. "Assessing the 'arrival of Democracy' in Central America." (2014): 117–126. online
 Bowman, Kirk, Fabrice Lehoucq, and James Mahoney. "Measuring political democracy: Case expertise, data adequacy, and Central America." Comparative Political Studies 38.8 (2005): 939–970. online
 Craig, Kern William. "Public Policy in Central America: An Empirical Analysis." Public Administration Research 2.2 (2013): 105+ online.
 Dym, Jordana. From sovereign villages to national states: city, state, and federation in Central America, 1759–1839 (UNM Press, 2006).
 von Feigenblatt, Otto Federico. "Costa Rica's Neo-Realist Foreign Policy: Lifting the Veil Hiding the Discursive Co-Optation of Human Rights, Human Security, and Cosmopolitan Official Rhetoric." International Journal of Arts & Sciences Conference, (2009). online
 Krenn, Michael L. The Chains of Interdependence: US Policy Toward Central America, 1945–1954 (ME Sharpe, 1996).
 Kruijt, Dirk. Guerrillas: war and peace in Central America (2013).
 LaFeber, Walter. Inevitable Revolutions: The United States in Central America (WW Norton & Company, 1993).
 Leonard, Thomas M. "Central America and the United States: Overlooked foreign policy objectives." The Americas (1993): 1–30 online.
 Oliva, Karen, and Chad Rector. "Unbalanced Regional Political Integration Is Unstable: Evidence from the Federal Republic of Central America (1823–1838)." Available at SSRN 2429123 (2014) online.
 Pearcy, Thomas L. We answer only to God: Politics and the Military in Panama, 1903–1947 (University of New Mexico Press, 1998).
 Pérez, Orlando J. Historical Dictionary of El Salvador (Rowman & Littlefield, 2016).
 Perez-Brignoli, Hector. A brief history of Central America (Univ of California Press, 1989).
 Sola, Mauricio. U.S. Intervention and Regime Change in Nicaragua (U of Nebraska Press, 2005).
 Topik, Steven C., and Allen Wells, eds. The second conquest of Latin America: coffee, henequen, and oil during the export boom, 1850–1930 (U of Texas Press, 2010).

External links
 American Heritage Dictionaries, Central America.
 Central America. Columbia Gazetteer of the World Online. 2006. New York: Columbia University Press.
 Hernández, Consuelo (2009). Reconstruyendo a Centroamérica a través de la poesía. Voces y perspectivas en la poesia latinoamericana del siglo XX. Madrid: Visor.

 Central America Video Links from the Dean Peter Krogh Foreign Affairs Digital Archives
 Central America country pages
 Teaching Central America